Michael Tan Defensor (born June 30, 1969) is a Filipino politician who most recently served as the Party-list Representative for Anakalusugan from 2019 to 2022. He is also the CEO of Pax Libera Mining, Inc.

Defensor began his political career in Quezon City, where he was a member of the city council from 1992 to 1995. He was elected as representative of the city's 3rd district in 1995. In congress, he was a member of the "Spice Boys", a group of young congressmen who led the efforts to impeach President Joseph Estrada. The impeachment trial and widescale protests of the Second EDSA Revolution resulted in Estrada's resignation and Vice President Gloria Macapagal Arroyo's accession to the presidency. Defensor went on to serve various positions in the Arroyo administration: chairman of the Housing and Urban Development Coordinating Council, Secretary of Environment and Natural Resources, and Malacañang Chief of Staff. He was also appointed to Ninoy Aquino International Airport and Philippine National Railways.

In 2019, he was elected again to the House of Representatives. He was a leading figure among the 70 representatives who voted to deny the franchise renewal of ABS-CBN. During the COVID-19 pandemic, he promoted and distributed the antiparasitic drug ivermectin as a prophylaxis and treatment for COVID-19, despite the lack of scientific evidence supporting its efficacy.

Defensor unsuccessfully ran for Mayor of Quezon City in 2010 and 2022.

Education
He finished elementary, Bachelor of Arts in History, and Masters in Public Administration at the University of the Philippines where he became a member of the UP Alpha Sigma Fraternity. He finished his secondary education at Niles McKinley High School in Niles, Ohio. He is married to Julie Rose Tactacan Defensor.

Political career

Quezon City councilor
Defensor was elected as a Quezon City councilor from the third district in the 1992 elections at the age of 23, making him the youngest member of that body. He received the Manuel Quezon Bantayog Award for Most Outstanding QC Councilor for the year 1994.

Congressman
Defensor ran for congressman of the third district of Quezon City in the 1995 election, subsequently winning. He won reelection in 1998.

Estrada impeachment
Defensor was part of the Spice Boys of the House of Representatives that spearheaded the filing of the impeachment case against then-president Joseph Estrada.

Arroyo cabinet
After Edsa II, Defensor was appointed as Secretary of the Housing and Urban Development Coordinating Council by President Gloria Macapagal Arroyo. He held that post until August 2004 when he was appointed Secretary of the Department of Environment and Natural Resources.

In the 2004 presidential election, he served as the official campaign spokesperson of President Arroyo. After his tenure as DENR Secretary he was appointed Presidential Chief of Staff. He resigned that post on February 10, 2007, to campaign for a post in the senate.

In June 2008 he was appointed head of Ninoy Aquino International Airport International Passenger Terminal 3 (NAIA-3) by virtue of the June 9, Executive Order No. 732 (creating the Presidential Task Force on the NAIA-3 that was "mandated to ensure the immediate opening and operation of Terminal III.")
The order provides for the NAIA-3 opening based on decisions of the Supreme Court and applicable laws.

On October 9, 2008, Defensor was named acting chairman of the Philippine National Railways (PNR).

Senate candidacy
Defensor was among the first to file for candidacy for the senate on February 12, 2007. He employed popular gossip show host Boy Abunda as his campaign manager. He was named to the TEAM Unity coalition backed by the Arroyo administration. However, he lost the race, placing 15th overall out of the 12 seats.

Representative for Anakalusugan

Denial of the franchise renewal of ABS-CBN

Defensor is one of the vocal opponents against the franchise renewal of ABS-CBN, together with Sagip Party-list Rep. Rodante Marcoleta and Cavite Seventh District Rep. Jesus Crispin Remulla. He is one of the 70 congressmen who voted "yes" to "kill" (deny) the franchise renewal of ABS-CBN, in favor of the report from the Technical Working Group. After claiming continuous victory, Defensor inititiated an online forum via Zoom and streamed live on Facebook along with Marcoleta, Remulla, Yedda Romualdez, Journalie Payonan, Danilo Fernandez, Jonathan Sy-Alvarado, Inno Dy and Alfred delos Santos to discuss the fate of ABS-CBN. On July 18, 2020, they discussed the potential takeover of the ill-fated network due to alleged tampered torrens title, fine for the alleged illegal sale of ABS-CBN TV Plus for almost , and the total closure of Sky Cable as suggested by Rep. LRay Villafuerte. Meanwhile, pro-ABS-CBN advocate Christine Bersola-Babao slammed the forum and called the congresspersons as "evil", and Senate President Tito Sotto slammed the possible takeover of ABS-CBN by calling the compound as constitutionally protected.

BTS sa Kongreso
In January 2021, Defensor is announced to be part of the new bloc "BTS sa Kongreso" (named after the K-pop boy band group BTS of South Korea), a coalition group formed by Alan Peter Cayetano of the House of Representatives of 18th Congress.

Ivermectin pantry

In April 2021, Defensor and SAGIP party-list representative Rodante Marcoleta initiated an "ivermectin pan-three" that distributes the anti-parasitic drug ivermectin, despite warnings from the World Health Organization on the lack of evidence to support ivermectin's efficacy against COVID-19.

Controversies

Involvement in ZTE-NBN corruption scandal

Mike Defensor, on July 4, 2008, filed 6-page perjury lawsuit Friday versus Rodolfo Noel Lozada for "testifying under oath that he had paid Lozada  to change his statement that he was not kidnapped at Ninoy Aquino International Airport (NAIA) when he arrived from Hong Kong at the height of the Philippine National Broadband Network controversy (ZTE Zhong Xing Telecommunication Equipment Company Limited scandal)."

Laws authored by Mike Defensor
RA 8313, An Act upgrading the Quirino Memorial Medical Center
RA 8976, An Act Requiring the Fortification of Processed Foods with Essential Micronutrients
An Act Creating the Department of Housing and Urban Development (co-author)
Dangerous Drugs Act of 1998 (co-author)
Act Amending the Magna Carta of the Disabled Persons (co-author)
Act Mandating the Nationwide Rabies Vaccination Program (co-author)
Technical Working Group (TWG) report recommending the denial of ABS-CBN's franchise application (co-author)

Other positions held
Former Vice-Chairman, House of Representatives’ Committee on Legislative Franchises
Chief Executive Officer, Pax Libera Mining
Chair, NiHAO Mineral Resources Inc. (mining company)
Chair, Geograce Resources Philippines (mining company)
Chairperson, Kabataang Liberal ng Pilipinas
Chairperson, National Movement of Young Legislators
Chairperson, National Union of Students in the Philippines
Lord Chancellor, Alpha Sigma Fraternity
Program Director, Youth Council of the Philippines

Director, Petron Corporation
On December 4, 2007, Mike Defensor quietly joined to the board of directors of Petron Corporation with former budget secretary Emilia Boncodin. Defensor had been frequenting Macau. Boncodin stated that Defensor was invited to the board by Nicasio Alcantara, government's team head / Chair, Petron. Membership in the Petron board is a lucrative job, as Defensor was offered a board seat in sequestered United Coconut Planters Bank. Defeated administration candidate, former senator Ralph Recto joined the board of Union Bank, controlled by the Aboitiz family.

See also
ABS-CBN franchise renewal controversy
National Telecommunications Commission (Philippines)

Notes

References
Mike Defensor official website
Mike Defensor website
Mike Defensor Facebook website (for AnaKalusugan Partylist)
Profile of Michael T. Defensor

|-

|-

|-

1969 births
Living people
Arroyo administration cabinet members
Chairpersons of the Housing and Urban Development Coordinating Council of the Philippines
Heads of government agencies of the Philippines
Laban ng Demokratikong Pilipino politicians
Lakas–CMD (1991) politicians
Liberal Party (Philippines) politicians
Members of the House of Representatives of the Philippines from Quezon City
Niles McKinley High School alumni
Party-list members of the House of Representatives of the Philippines
People from Quezon City
People's Reform Party politicians
Presidential chiefs of staff (Philippines)
Quezon City Council members
Secretaries of Environment and Natural Resources of the Philippines